The North Pacific Coast Guard Forum (NPCGF) was initiated by the Japan Coast Guard in 2000 as a venue to foster multilateral cooperation through the sharing of information on matters related to combined operations, exchange of information, illegal drug trafficking, maritime security, fisheries enforcement, illegal migration, and maritime domain awareness.  The current membership includes agencies from Canada, China, Japan, South Korea, Russia, and the United States.

The first Forum was held in Tokyo in 2000 and has followed an alternating semi-annual cycle of technical experts and principals meetings since.  Between 2000 and 2005, meetings were sponsored by Japan, Russia, United States, South Korea, Canada and Japan.

The forum has had success in documenting best practices from the member countries in areas of illegal drug trafficking, maritime security, fisheries enforcement and illegal migration, has a web-based information exchange system, and has published a manual for combined operations.

Continued work
The cooperation fostered in the forum was successfully tested during a tabletop exercise in Victoria, British Columbia, Canada in March 2004 involving the tracking of a fictitious vessel suspected of carrying weapons of mass destruction as it transited the international waters off each member country’s coast.  During the summer of 2005, the forum planned and executed actual at-sea combined operations were conducted to enforce Illegal, Unregulated, Unreported (IUU) Fisheries regulations in the North Pacific Ocean. Member nations noted the success of the 2005 combined operations and have continued them in recent years.

Role model
The success of the NPHCGAF encouraged the United States to take the lead on establishing a similar forum for north Atlantic countries. In 2005 and 2006 the US Coast Guard worked with dozens of European countries and Canada to advance the idea and in August 2007 a plenary session will be held in Sweden to finalize the details of that organization.

8th North Pacific Coast Guard Forum Summit in St. Petersburg, Russia

Statement by Admiral Thad Allen, USCG:

“I enjoyed joining with leaders of civil maritime agencies from Canada, China, Japan, South Korea and Russia for the North Pacific Coast Guard Forum this week in St. Petersburg, Russia. The North Pacific Coast Guard Forum provides a great opportunity to foster multilateral cooperation by sharing information and expertise on matters related to combined maritime operations, illegal drug trafficking, maritime security, fisheries enforcement, and illegal migration. As a multi-mission maritime agency, the U.S. Coast Guard is uniquely positioned to engage our maritime partners in these areas of common concern. We are building on the successes of past forums as we work to improve mutually beneficial cooperation and coordination that will enhance maritime safety, security and environmental protection throughout the North Pacific. Our chief goal in St. Petersburg has been to exchange information necessary to improve the security and safety of vessels at sea and coastal nations in the region. We have worked to identify ways to expand day-to-day cooperation between our agencies in operations supporting fisheries management, environmental protection, search and rescue, and maritime security.

“The NPCGF reached a milestone in 2005 when vessels from the U.S. Coast Guard, China, Russia and Japan conducted combined operations at sea. This year’s forum will build on that success and address a broad range of maritime issues. Drawing on the success of the NPCGF, civil maritime agencies for nations of the North Atlantic will meet in Sweden in October 2007 to inaugurate the North Atlantic Coast Guard Forum.”

References

Japan Coast Guard
Coast guards
International law enforcement organizations